Sebastian Karlsson (born 2 January 1985), known professionally as Sebastian, is a Swedish singer and performer, best known for his participation in Idol 2005, where he came in second place after Agnes Carlsson. He got a radio hit in Sweden with his first single "Do what you're told" in 2006.

Karlsson was born in Morgongåva.  He competed in the Swedish Melodifestivalen 2007 with the song "When the Night Comes Falling" for the opportunity to represent Sweden in the Eurovision Song Contest 2007 in Helsinki, Finland, finished 8th in the final. He returned to Melodifestivalen in 2011 with the song "No One Else Could", finishing 5th in the third semi-final.

Discography

Albums

Singles

External links
 

1985 births
Living people
People from Heby Municipality
Idol (Swedish TV series) participants
21st-century Swedish singers
21st-century Swedish male singers
Melodifestivalen contestants of 2011
Melodifestivalen contestants of 2007
Melodifestivalen contestants of 2006